Mariam Luyombo (formerly Dorothy Nanziri) is a Ugandan educational entrepreneur and  the director of Taibah Schools in Uganda

Background & Education 
Mariam Luyombo attended Mount Saint Mary's College, Namagunga for high school. She earned bachelor's and master's degrees in education from Makerere University in Kampala in 1985 and 1997 and has also taken a number of courses in business in Uganda and the United States.

Career 
Mariam Luyombo started out a secondary school teacher at Makerere College School between 1987-1988 and then proceeded to St. Joseph's Secondary School  Nsambya (1988-1990). She was subsequently headmistress of Nabisunsa Muslim Girls' School.

In 1991 she founded her first school, Taibah High School Kampala; she subsequently founded Silver Spoon Daycare Center Kampala in 1996, Taibah Junior School Entebbe Road in 1998, and Taibah College School Entebbe Road in 2000.

In 2013, she was the executive director of Uganda Women Entrepreneurs Association (UWEAL).

Achievements and awards 
Awards she has received include the first national Rotary Club enterprise award for young women entrepreneurs  and New Vision in 1995, the Namagunga Old Girls' Association award in 1998, and a Uganda Investment Authority certificate of recognition for championing education change in Uganda in 2001.

In 2014, she was one of the 20 recipients of Uganda's Golden Jubilee Medal for her "contribution in the education area for Taibah Schools" and entrepreneurship.

In 2015, she was one of the 2015 World of Difference Award Winners & Champions

Personal life
Mariam Luyombo is married to Hajji Abbas Luyombo who is the owner of Taibah Group of Companies. She has three children. She migrated to Canada in 2006 and currently lives in Ontario, Canada, where she owns a business.

References 

Living people
Year of birth missing (living people)
Ugandan educators
Ugandan women business executives
Makerere University alumni